Lipsbergs (feminine: Lipsberga) is a Latvian masculine surname, derived from the German language. Individuals with the surname include:

Edgars Lipsbergs (born 1989), Latvian ice hockey player
Miks Lipsbergs (born 1991), Latvian ice hockey player
Roberts Lipsbergs (born 1994), Latvian ice hockey player

Latvian-language masculine surnames